Chelonarium is a genus of turtle beetles in the family Chelonariidae. There are about 14 described species in Chelonarium.

Species
These 14 species belong to the genus Chelonarium:

 Chelonarium atrum Fabricius, 1801
 Chelonarium grande Pic, 1922
 Chelonarium lecontei Thomson, 1867
 Chelonarium liratulum Ancey, 1884
 Chelonarium luteovestitum Méquignon, 1934
 Chelonarium montanum Wickham, 1914
 Chelonarium murinum Méquignon, 1934
 Chelonarium nitidum Méquignon, 1934
 Chelonarium obscuripenne Pic, 1917
 Chelonarium pilosellum Chevrolat, 1880
 Chelonarium rufum Pic, 1922
 Chelonarium simulator Méquignon, 1934
 Chelonarium sp-one
 Chelonarium tonkineum Pic, 1922

References

Further reading

 

Byrrhoidea
Articles created by Qbugbot